The 1987–88 South Midlands League season was 59th in the history of South Midlands League.

Premier Division

The Premier Division featured 15 clubs which competed in the division last season, along with 2 new clubs, promoted from last season's Division One: 
Electrolux
Biggleswade Town

League table

Division One

The Division One featured 11 clubs which competed in the division last season, along with 2 new clubs:
Stony Stratford Town
Delco Products

League table

References

1987-88
8